Yolande of Aragon or Violante of Sicily (Kingdom of Sicily – 1428, Italian: Jolanda d'Aragona, Catalan: ,) was the legitimized daughter of King Martin I of Sicily and countess of Niebla. She was a member of the House of Barcelona. Eugénie de Montijo, the last Empress consort of the French, was descended from her.

Life
She was the only daughter of King Martin I of Sicily and Sicilian noblewoman Agatuccia Pesce. She was born out of wedlock in Sicily. Before Blanche I of Navarre arrived in Sicily to be married to her father, the king sent her and her younger brother Fadrique (illegitimate son of Martin I and Tarsia Rizzari) to the Aragonese court to be reared in the care of the king's mother, Queen Maria de Luna. She was twice married. Her first husband was Enrique Pérez de Guzmán, 2nd Count de Niebla, who she married in 1405. This marriage produced no issue and was annulled. Her second marriage was to Martín Fernández de Guzmán, son of Alvár Pérez de Guzmán, 6th Lord of Orgaz. She gave birth to three daughters. She died in 1428.

Issue 

 m. 1st, Enrique Pérez de Guzmán, 2nd Count of Niebla (1371–1436), annulled, no issue.
 m. 2nd, Martín Fernández de Guzmán
 Catalina de Aragón y Guzmán m. Juan del Castillo Portocarrero, lord of Santa María del Campo and Santiago de la Torre
 Luisa de Aragón y del Castillo (ca. 1450–?) m. Juan Ramírez de Guzmán y Mendoza, lord of Castañar
 Catalina de Aragón y Guzmán m. Francisco de Guzmán
 Lope de Guzmán y Aragón m. Leonor Enríquez de Guzmán
 María de Guzmán y Aragón m. Alonso de Luzón
 María de Aragón, 2nd marchioness of Castañeda, m. Sancho de Monroy
 María Leonor de Monroy, 3rd marchioness of Castañeda, m. José Funes de Villalpando, margrave of Osera
 María Regalada de Villalpando, 4th countess of Osera, m. 1st, Diego Gómez de Sandoval de la Cerda (ca. 1631–1668), 5th duke of Lerma, childless; m. 2nd, Cristóbal Portocarrero de Guzmán Enríquez de Luna, 4th count of Montijo
 Cristóbal Portocarrero, 5th count of Montijo, m. María Dominga Fernández de Córdoba, 12th countess of Teba
  Cristóbal Portocarrero (1728–1757), 6th count of Montijo, m. María Josefa López de Zúñiga (1733–?)
  María Francisca Portocarrero (1754–1808), 7th countess of Montijo, m. Felipe Antonio de Palafox (1739–1790)
 Cipriano de Palafox y Portocarrero (1784–1839), count of Montijo, m. María Manuela Kirkpatrick (1794–1879)
 Eugénie de Montijo (1826–1920), Empress consort of the French
 Agnes de Aragón y Guzmán m. N. Suarez de Vargos
 Marina de Aragón y Guzmán m. Pedro de Vargos

Notes

Bibliography
 Silleras-Fernández, Núria: Spirit and Force: Politics, Public and Private in the Reign of Maria de Luna (1396–1406), In: Theresa Earenfight (ed.): Queenship and Political Power in Medieval and Early Modern Spain, Ashgate, 78–90, 2005. , 9780754650744 URL: See External links

External links
 
 
 Núria Silleras-Fernández: Spirit and Force: Politics, Public and Private in the Reign of Maria de Luna (1396–1406) – 18 April 2015
 Libro d'Oro della Nobilità Mediterranea/Bellonidi (Aragonesi) – 18 April 2015

1428 deaths
Spanish countesses
House of Aragon
Year of birth unknown
15th-century people from the Kingdom of Aragon
15th-century Spanish women
Daughters of kings